Ladan is an urban-type settlement in Pryluky Raion, Chernihiv Oblast, Ukraine. It hosts the administration of Ladan settlement hromada, one of the hromadas of Ukraine. Population: 

Ladan is located on the right bank of the Uday.

Economy

Transportation
A railway line connects Ladan with Pryluky, however, there is no passenger traffic. The closest passenger railway station is in Pryluky.

Ladan is on a local road connecting Pryluky and Sribne. At both ends it has access to H07 highway which connects Kyiv and Sumy.

References

Urban-type settlements in Pryluky Raion